
The Paper Bag Players are a New York City based theatre troupe for children and was founded in 1958  by Judith Martin, Shirley Kaplin, Sudie Bond, and Remy Charlip.  Their goal was to create a theater for children that would incorporate the experimental art scene of Manhattan's downtown.

Awards
The company has won many awards, including several Obies and repeated grants from the National Endowment for the Arts and City of New York.

Members 
 Founding: Judith Martin, Shirley Kaplin, Sudie Bond, and Remy Charlip
 Acted or toured with: Betty Osgood, Irving Burton, James Lally, Jan Maxwell, Ted Brackett, Guy Gsell
 Musical director: Donald Ashwander

Music 
A distinctive feature of the Paper Bag Players is their modern ragtime music, this is largely the work of Donald Ashwander, who worked closely with Judy Martin until Ashwander's passing in 1994.

References

External links 
 http://www.thepaperbagplayers.org/ Official Site
 Paper Bag Players records, 1958-2009 (bulk 1990-2004), held by the Billy Rose Theatre Division, New York Public Library for the Performing Arts
Children's Theatre companies in New York City